

Events
January 11 – Carlo Tresca, editor of the Socialist Italian-language newspaper Il Martello, is murdered in Manhattan after seeking political asylum in the United States. Tresca's assassination, supposedly carried out by mobster Carmine Galante, was said to have been arranged by Italian dictator Benito Mussolini's fascist government.
January 25 – New York mobster Gaetano "Tommy" Lucchese becomes a naturalized US citizen despite efforts of the U.S. government to thwart it.
February 2 – Chicago's "Queen of the Dice Girls" and Outfit-associate girlfriend, Estelle Carey, is found brutally murdered and burned, possibly in connection to The Outfit – Hollywood extortion scandal then under federal investigation.
March 18 – Several high-ranking members of the Chicago Outfit including Francesco "Frank 'The Enforcer' Nitti" Nitto, Felice "Paul 'The Waiter' Ricca" DeLucia, Phil D'Andrea, Charles "Cherry Nose" Gioe, Lou Kaufman, Louis "Little New York" Campagna and Filippo "John 'Handsome Johnny' Roselli" Sacco are indicted by a federal grand jury in connection to extortion operations against Hollywood movie studios by Outfit turncoat William Morris "Willie" Bioff.
March 19 – Shortly after being indicted for extortion, Outfit boss Francesco "Frank 'The Enforcer' Nitti" Nitto commits suicide near a Riverside, Illinois railroad yard. Nitti kills himself because underboss Paul Ricca insists that Nitti take responsibility for the Hollywood extortion operation and serve the prison term, because Nitti brought the likes of Outfit turncoat William Morris "Willie" Bioff into the Hollywood scheme. However, Nitti suffers from severe claustrophobia. Antonino "Tony," "Joe Batters" Accardo succeeds Nitti as the day-to-day boss of the organization, while Ricca gets a prison sentence.
July 9–10 – The Allied invasion of Sicily (Operation Husky)  ends August 17 in an Allied victory. Sicilian Mafia boss Calogero Vizzini allegedly helps the American army during the invasion. In the US, the Office of Naval Intelligence (ONI) had recruited Mafia support to protect the New York waterfront from Axis Powers sabotage since the US had entered the war in December 1941. The ONI collaborated with Charles "Lucky" Luciano and his partner Meyer Lansky, a Jewish mobster, in what was called Operation Underworld. The resulting Mafia contacts were also used by the US Office of Strategic Services (OSS) – the wartime predecessor of the Central Intelligence Agency (CIA) – during the invasion of Sicily. Popular myth has it that a US Army airplane had flown over Vizzini’s home town Villalba on the day of the invasion and dropped a yellow silk handkerchief marked with a black L (indicating Luciano). Two days later, three American tanks rolled into Villalba after driving thirty miles through enemy territory. Vizzini climbed aboard and spent the next six days traveling through western Sicily organizing support for the advancing American troops. As General Patton's Third Division moved onward the signs of its dependence on Mafia support were obvious to the local population. The Mafia protected the roads from snipers, arranged enthusiastic welcomes for the advancing troops, and provided guides through the confusing mountain terrain. Many historians are inclined to dismiss this legend nowadays. The American Military Government of Occupied Territories (AMGOT) looking for anti-fascist notables to replace fascist authorities made Don Calogero Vizzini mayor of Villalba, as well as an Honorary Colonel of the US Army. Because of his excellent connections, Vizzini also became the ‘king’ of the rampant post-war black market. AMGOT relied on mafiosi who were considered staunch anti-fascists because of the repression under Benito Mussolini. Many other mafiosi, such as Calogero Vizzini and Giuseppe Genco Russo, were appointed as mayors of their own home towns. Coordinating the AMGOT effort was the former lieutenant-governor of New York, Colonel Charles Poletti, whom Luciano once described as "one of our good friends." The US Military grants  Michele Navarra, the Mafia boss of Corleone, permission to collect abandoned military vehicles left by the Italian army during the allied invasion of Sicily.
October 28 – Former leader of the New Orleans crime family Carlo Matranga dies in Los Angeles, California of natural causes.
December 22 – Paul Ricca, Louis Campagna, John Roselli and four other defendants are convicted of extortion with each fined $10,000 and received prison sentences ranging from seven-to-10 years. They "walk" after three years, because of some dubious, behind-the-scenes mischief between The Outfit and the U.S. Justice Department, during the Truman Administration.

Births
September 8 – Marat Balagula, Russian mob in the US
June 11  – Henry Hill, Lucchese crime family associate

Deaths
March 19 – Frank Nitti, Chicago Outfit leader
October 28 – Carlo Matranga, New Orleans crime family leader

References

Organized crime
Years in organized crime